Surender Mohan Pathak  (born 19 February 1940 at Khemkaran, in Tarn Taran district near Amritsar, in the Majha region of Punjab) is an author of Hindi-language crime fiction with nearly 300 novels to his credit. His writing career, along with his full-time job in Indian Telephone Industries, Delhi, began in the early 1960s with his Hindi translations of Ian Fleming's James Bond novels and the works of James Hadley Chase. He also wrote his own James Bond series.

His first short story, 57 saal puraana aadmi (५७ साल पुराना आदमी, The Man 57 from Years Ago), was published in a Hindi magazine Manohar Kahaniyaan (मनोहर कहानीयां) in 1959. His first full-length novel, Purane Gunah Naye Gunahgar (Sunil Series), was published in Neelam Jaasoos (a Hindi crime fiction magazine) in 1963.

His major work began with what is called the "Sunil" series which consists of at least 122 novels. Sunil, a debonair and upright investigative journalist for the fictional daily newspaper Blast, lives in the fictional city of Rajnagar, a metropolitan city located on the coastline. Sunil has a quixotic nature when it comes to damsels in distress, which happens only too often. He is a man in his 30s, who is willing to go any lengths in pursuit of justice, mostly with help of his best friend Ramakant Malhotra, a dipsomaniac and owner of a club called Youth Club. His attempts to protect the innocent often result in Sunil ending up on the wrong side of the law, bringing him face to face with Inspector Prabhudayal, the exceptionally strict and incorruptible officer in charge of the homicide division of the Rajnagar Police.

The "philosopher" detective Sudhir Kumar Kohli is the protagonist of Pathak's Sudhir Series, all narrated in the first person. Sudhir is the diametric opposite of Sunil, proudly proclaiming himself dilli ka khaas kism ka haraami who frequently enlists the help of Inspector Devender Kumar Yadav, who can easily be persuaded to do something dishonest. A recent novel of this (in)famous series has been translated by Giriraj Sharan (uncredited) and published by Diamond Books under the title The Last Goal.

However the best-known series of novels of Pathak is Vimal (विमल), a.k.a. Sardar Surender Singh Sohal (सरदार सुरेन्द्र सिंह सोहल), a.k.a. another dozen names he uses to camouflage his identity in the Mumbai underworld. Vimal is a Robinhood like character, who is constantly on the run from the law due to circumstances out of his control.  He has taken up arms against gangsters like Rajbahadur Bakhia and, after killing him, his next avatar Iqbal Singh and then Vyaas Shankar Gajre. The Sardar has associates like Tukaram and his henchmen, like Wagle and Irfan, etc.  Vimal is not a private detective or police inspector but a criminal wanted in seven states.

In addition, Pathak has also authored several novels not belonging to any specific series, which are labelled as 'thriller' novels irrespective of their storyline. Many collections of joke books compiled by Pathak have also been published. Several authors have been known to plagiarise or "borrow" heavily from his works.

Series Works

Sunil Series

Vimal Series

Sudheer Series

Thrillers

Jeet Singh Series

Mukesh Mathur Series

Vivek Agashe Series

Vikas Gupta Series

Pramod Series

Socials

Children Books

Short Stories

Joke Book

Influence

Pathak was the first writer to coin the term company that has today become common slang for Mumbai underworld gangs like D-Company
The Tandoor scandal in Delhi, in which a man had tried to dispose of the corpse of his victim in a furnace, was an idea taken from Pathak's non-serial novel titled Mawali (मवाली).
In 2006 robbery at UTI Bank, Vikaspuri, a man called Sandeep Bhatnagar looted four million Indian rupees by pretending to be a human bomb. Investigators learned after arresting the culprit that the idea was copied from Zameer ka Qaidi (ज़मीर का क़ैदी), one of the latest Vimal-series novels.

Translations
Two books from Pathak's popular Vimal series — 65 Lakh ki Dakaiti and Din Dahade Dakaiti — were translated into English under the titles The 65 Lakh Heist and Daylight Robbery by Sudarshan Purohit, a Bangalore-based software engineer. The 65 Lakh Heist was published in March 2009 and Daylight Robbery in January 2010, both by Blaft, a Chennai-based publisher.

See also
The 65 Lakh Heist
Daylight Robbery
Mawali

References

External links
  Official Website
A latest interview with author by Hindustan Times Brunch

Article by Pathak about Ibne Safi, the celebrated grandmaster of Urdu crime fiction
Blaft English Translations

1940 births
Hindi-language writers
People from Amritsar district
Living people
Indian thriller writers
Novelists from Punjab, India
Deaf writers
20th-century Indian short story writers
20th-century Indian novelists
Pulp fiction writers
Indian deaf people